Vernon Kyhl (July 30, 1908 – September 17, 1973) was an American politician who served in the Iowa Senate from 1963 to 1973.

He died on September 17, 1973, in Parkersburg, Iowa at age 65.

References

1908 births
1973 deaths
Republican Party Iowa state senators
20th-century American politicians